Tyler Perry's I Can Do Bad All by Myself is an 1999 American stage play written, directed and produced by and starring Tyler Perry. The play marks for the first official appearance of the well-known fictional character Madea, who is portrayed by Perry. Although the original production wasn't recorded, the live performance that was released on DVD and VHS was recorded live in Washington, D.C. at the Lincoln Theatre in August 2002.

DVD plot

Act One
Vianne, who in the middle of settling a bitter divorce with her ex-husband Anthony– a successful stock broker, has moved in with her grandmother, Mable "Madea" Simmons. Madea is sick with complications from her diabetes. Another person Madea is helping out is Bobby, an ex-con. Bobby is Madea's handyman and usually cuts her grass. Both Madea and Vianne find him very attractive, though Vianne would not like to admit it.
	
Vianne's niece, Keisha, is also staying with Madea. Keisha's mother, Maylee shows up to her school wearing a blond wig and a mini-skirt, embarrassing Keisha. Maylee later pops up at the house announcing her engagement to none other than Vianne's ex-husband, Anthony.

Keisha is resentful towards her mother for being away for so long. When Anthony calls, Maylee drops everything to assist him, leaving Keisha all alone (Motherless Child).
	
Cora, Madea's daughter, arrives, announcing she is only staying for the weekend, as she lives out of town. Keisha confides in her aunt about her troubles with the kids at school as they all bully her except for one kid, named Kelly. Madea's next door neighbor, Mr. Brown, also drops by and brings in her mail. 
	
While everyone is preparing for dinner, Bobby, taking a shower, runs downstairs to get some soap. While Bobby and Vianne flirt with each other, Madea can tell that Vianne secretly likes him. Tensions are high during dinner as Bobby and Anthony debate over their religious beliefs and Anthony insults Madea. The family then reminisces over their time in the church choir, singing old gospel favorites (Old Time Mix).
	
Tensions blow soon after when Anthony starts insulting Vianne. Maylee and Vianne then get into a spat of their own. This leads a hurt Vianne to pull a knife on Anthony, alarming everybody. The entire family disperses, except Cora, who tries to calm Vianne down. Vianne, left with all the rubble of the night, tries to reflect (Lord I'm Sorry).

Act Two
Bobby returns, flirting with Vianne, and tells her his story of how he was incarcerated. Vianne opens up about her past relationships & newfound doubts while Bobby assures her their relationship will be different (Let Me Hold You).

Maylee gets a call from the school nurse about Keisha. Anthony tells Maylee that she must either choose between him or her daughter, convinced she'd be an hindrance to his lifestyle. When Keisha arrives home, Maylee orders her to put her stuff down as they are going to go to the clinic. Keisha is pregnant with the neighbor boy, Kelly's child. Maylee insists she have an abortion. Cora tries to get through to her, but Maylee will not have it. It is revealed that Keisha was the product of a rape that Maylee endured at 13, by the hands of a man her mother let use her for drug money. With that, Maylee forces Keisha out of the house and Cora is left alone praying for the saving of her family (In the Name of Jesus).
	
Madea gets a call from an Eric Jones offering Bobby a job and relays the message to Bobby and Vianne. When Maylee and Keisha get back from the clinic, Madea admonishes the both of them. It is, however,  too late as Keisha is too far gone to get an abortion. 
 
Vianne tries to get Maylee to understand that Anthony does not love her and he is only marrying her to get back at Vianne. Maylee, upset, refuses to believe her. Bobby tells everyone about his job offer in California as Head Foreman, but he is reluctant to accept.

Vianne and Bobby force Madea upstairs as they talk about their future. Bobby wants marriage and kids, but Vianne does not see it for her right now. As they talk, the doorbell rings and it is Mr. Brown, who is mad at Madea for giving his dog sleeping pills. Madea and Brown get into a light insulting match, leaving Vianne and Bobby to call the vet.

The next day, while Bobby is packing his bags, he runs into Anthony. Anthony tries to turn Bobby against Vianne, again insulting her weight. Bobby tells Anthony that Vianne never loved him. Anthony threatens Bobby to move away to California and leave Vianne alone for good. Saying that if he stays here, then Anthony will call his probation officer and get him sent back to prison, seeing as they're old friends.

Police sirens are then heard and Madea enters, running upstairs. Apparently, Madea and Maylee were out getting their nails done, when the nail salon employees began talking about Madea. One employee, in particular, insulted her, comparing her to Godzilla. So, she shot up the nail salon and hightailed home. Maylee comes back, angrily relaying the details to the boys.

Bobby debates whether to stay or take the job offer in California. Vianne tells him to follow his heart. Bobby realizes he really wants to stay with Vianne even though she says she's not ready for a relationship. However, Bobby still walks out the door and heads for California. Madea tells Vianne that she needs to go after her man. After a few minutes of hesitation, Vianne decides to chase Bobby down before he leaves. However, as soon as Vianne opens the door, Bobby is revealed to be standing right there. Bobby comes inside and proposes to Vianne, and under Madea's direction, she agrees.
	
Vianne drives Madea off to the casino. Maylee congratulates Bobby on the proposal, though she is admittedly jealous of their relationship. Cora gets Maylee and Keisha to reconcile (It’s Gonna Be Hallelujah).
	
Later that day, Maylee brings Anthony his bags and lets him know that he will be driving home alone. Once Anthony leaves, Maylee apologizes to Vianne for everything. Cora gathers the family to reflect on all of the insight they've gained in spite of all of that has caused them pain in the past (God is the Answer).

Shows

Cast

1999 Original Cast
Tyler Perry as Madea
Kisha Grandy as Vianne 
Tyga Graham as Bobby 
Tosha Moore as Maylee
Terri Brown-Britton (2000)
David Mann as Mr. Brown
Tamela Mann as Cora
Carl Pertile as Anthony

2002 Film Cast
Tyler Perry as Madea
Kisha Grandy as Vianne 
Tyga Graham as Bobby 
Donna Stewart as Maylee
Carl Pertile as Anthony 
Elaine O'Neale as Keisha 
Tamela Mann as Cora 
David Mann as Mr. Brown

The Band 

 Elvin Ross - Musical Director
 Mike Frazier - Bass
 Sheryl Harper - Drums
 Jerome Harmon - Keyboards
 Jim Gorst - Sound
 Davie Holmbo - Sound

Musical numbers
All songs written and/or produced by Tyler Perry and Elvin D. Ross.

Original 1999 production

Act One
"Overture" - Band
"I Can Do Bad All By Myself" - Vianne & Company
"Old Time Mix (consisting of Angels Watching Over Me / There's a Leak in This Old Building / I Know the Lord Will Make a Way)" – Brown, Maylee, Vianne, Cora and Company
"Silver & Gold" or "Bye Baby" - Vianne

Act Two
"Let Me Hold You" - Bobby
"It's Gonna Be Hallelujah" - Cora 
"Lord, I'm Sorry" - Maylee
"Bye Baby (Reprise)" - Madea
"Kirk Franklin & The Family Medley" - Cora, Brown, Vianne & Company

Taped 2002 performance

Act One
"Overture / I Can Do Bad All By Myself" - Band & Company
"Motherless Child" – Keisha
"Old Time Mix (consisting of Angels Watching Over Me / There's a Leak in This Old Building / I Know the Lord Will Make a Way)" – Brown, Maylee, Vianne, Cora and Company
"Lord, I'm Sorry" – Vianne

Act Two
"Let Me Hold You" – Bobby
"In the Name of Jesus" – Cora
"It's Gonna Be Hallelujah" – Cora
"God Is the Answer" - Company

Production Trivia
Jamecia Bennett and Quan Howell originally had parts in the show that were cut early on in the original run.
Terri Brown-Britton of Trin-i-tee 5:7 would assume the role of Maylee early on into the tour.
Keisha was a new character instated in the 2002 performance. Her song, the spiritual, "Motherless Child" is a hold-over from Tyler Perry & T.D. Jakes' Woman, Thou Art Loosed!, which Elaine O'Neale also starred as Michelle.
Carl Pertile previously worked with Tyler Perry on his first play, I Know I've Been Changed. He later originated the role of Mike in Why Did I Get Married?. A show that Donna Stewart would also star in. 
Kisha Grandy, Tamela Mann, and David Mann are original members of Kirk Franklin's group, The Family. In the shows that Kisha appeared, she would sing her rendition of the group's "Silver & Gold". While at the end, Kisha, Tamela, and David would close out the show with a medley of other memorable songs from their time with The Family. 
On nights that Kisha didn't appear, "Bye Baby" would be sung in its place.
In the original show, "Let Me Hold You" included a second verse, in which Bobby proposes to Vianne.
Kelly Price was the original leading lady who was supposed to join the show, but pulled out at the last minute. She was supposed to play the role of "Aunt Lizzie", and sing a few of her own songs. Due to this sudden change, Madea's role was boosted over what was originally a short cameo, and the rest of her lines were split among the rest of the cast.
During the 2002 performance, there are mentions of characters and events that happen in the previously-taped show, Madea's Family Reunion, such as the revelation between Cora's daughters, Lisa & Tina.

Film Adaptation
A film adaptation titled I Can Do Bad All By Myself, was released on September 11, 2009. The film has a completely different storyline from the play. The only thing that remains the same is the title. Despite this, Tyler Perry appears as Madea and Joe.

Vianne and Anthony were loosely adapted for A Madea Family Funeral.

References

External links

Plays by Tyler Perry
1999 plays
Comedy plays
African-American plays
American plays adapted into films